Paavo Johannes Aaltonen (11 December 1919 – 9 September 1962) was a Finnish artistic gymnast and a three-time Olympic champion. At the 1948 Summer Olympics, he won four medals, of which three were gold, including a three-way tie for gold in the pommel horse with teammates Veikko Huhtanen and Heikki Savolainen. He also competed at the 1952 Summer Olympics winning a team bronze for a total of five Olympic medals during his career. At the 1950 World Championships, he won the gold medal on the horizontal bar and the team silver medal.

References 

1919 births
1962 deaths
People from Kemi
Finnish male artistic gymnasts
Gymnasts at the 1948 Summer Olympics
Gymnasts at the 1952 Summer Olympics
Olympic gymnasts of Finland
Olympic gold medalists for Finland
Olympic bronze medalists for Finland
Olympic medalists in gymnastics
Medalists at the 1952 Summer Olympics
Medalists at the 1948 Summer Olympics
Sportspeople from Lapland (Finland)
20th-century Finnish people